Jacques Cartier Provincial Park is a provincial park in northwestern Prince Edward Island, Canada, approximately 6 km northeast of Alberton.  The park is named for Jacques Cartier, who in 1534 was the first European to arrive on the island. This is celebrated each year in July on Rediscovery Day.

References

Provincial parks of Prince Edward Island
Parks in Prince County, Prince Edward Island